Departure Yard Railway Station is located near Baloch Colony flyover on Sharah-e-Faisal in Karachi, Pakistan.

See also
 List of railway stations in Pakistan
 Pakistan Railways

References

External links

Railway stations in Karachi
Railway stations on Karachi–Peshawar Line (ML 1)